The Grand Prior's Award, also called the Grand Prior Award, named for Grand Prior of the Venerable Order of Saint John, is the highest award that a cadet in the St. John Ambulance Youth Programme can achieve after the Sovereign's Gold Award. The Grand Prior's Award recognises a self-motivated and capable young person's ongoing commitment, compassion, and support. It is recognised and awarded internationally by various branches of the program. The Grand Prior's Award is recognised in many countries, including England and the Islands, Wales, Canada, Malaysia, New Zealand, and Australia.

England and the Islands 
Cadets begin to work on the Grand Prior's Award scheme after receiving the Membership award. The award scheme was named for the Grand Prior's of the Order of St John, the Duke of Gloucester. The award scheme involves cadets completing 16 subjects. Four subjects must be completed for the bronze level, four more for silver, and a further four for gold. After completing another four subjects, the cadet will be awarded with the Grand Prior's Award. Cadets can continue to work on this award until they are 21 years old.

Malaysia 

In its early years, the scheme had a different subject group (cycling, camping, tracking, etc.) than is used today. These groups were removed and merged to make the scheme that is currently used today. The 26 badges are split into five different groups according to the nature of the activities. These groups are: care, emergency care, leisure, communication, and life and social skills.

Cadets who successfully complete the Grand Prior's Award receive the award from the Order Secretariat in London, England. Cadets who obtain the Grand Prior's Award are known as Grand Prior Cadets and can wear the badge as adult members throughout their service in St John Ambulance.

Badge requirements
 12 proficiency badges in total (include "Knowledge of the Order" badge)
 Took AT LEAST 1 badge and NOT MORE THAN 3 badges from each category
 The individual must be less than 21 years old on the date of assessment for their last badge
 To apply GRAND PRIOR AWARD before 16 years old must had 4 badge.

Badges
 Knowledge of the Order (compulsory)

Care 

 Animal Care
 Care in the Community
 Caring for the Sick
 Caring for Children
 Anti Drug Abuse

Emergency Care 

 Accident Prevention
 Fire Fighting and Prevention
 Casualty Simulation
 Personal Survival and Life Saving
 Civil Defence

Leisure 

 Outdoor Pursuits
 Fitness
 Craft
 Map Reading and Navigation
 Musician

Communication 

 Communication to the Impaired
 Administration Skills
 Computer Skills
 Signalling
 International Friendship

Life and Social Skills 

 Citizenship
 Home Skills
 Cookery and Nutrition
 Do-It-Yourself
 Cadet Training Course

New Zealand 
In New Zealand, the proficiency badges are split into three levels: green (8–10 years), blue (11–12 years), and gold (13–18 years). Different level badges have different coloured frames and have learning criteria suited to the age range, with gold level being the most difficult. Only the gold level badges count towards the Grand Prior's Award. A cadet must achieve the six compulsory badges and six badges of their choice to be awarded the Grand Prior's Award. There are 29 badges to choose from.

Badge requirements
 Complete six gold level compulsory subjects and six other gold level badges
 The cadet must be less than 21 years old on the date of assessment for their last badge
 The first gold level badge must be completed prior to the cadet's 18th birthday
 The cadet must have completed at least 100 hours of community service

Gold level badges

 Accident Prevention
 Animal Care
 Camping
 Caregivers (compulsory)
 Casualty Simulation
 Child Care
 Civil Defence
 Communication (compulsory)
 Community Awareness (compulsory)
 Drill (compulsory)
 Environment
 Faith
 Fire Safety
 First Aid (compulsory)
 Fitness
 Hauora (Health)
 Hobbies
 Home Technology
 Global Citizenship
 Information Communication Technology
 Leadership
 Maoritanga
 Road Safety
 St John (compulsory)
 The Arts
 Ventureship
 Water Safety
 Kiwiana
 Media Studies

Australia 
The Grand Prior's Badge is the highest award that a cadet can receive and is awarded to cadets who have earned 12 proficiency badges, including the Knowledge of the Order Badge and the Family Care Badge. The first Grand Prior's badges in the world were awarded in 1933 to three cadets; two were from the United Kingdom, and the other, Marion Higgins from Marrickville Cadet Nursing Division, was from Australia. The award is worn on the left sleeve for as long as the cadet remains a member of the Operations Branch and is one of the only cadet badges that can be worn as an adult.

References 

Humanitarian and service awards
St John Ambulance